Ge, ghe, or he (Г г; italics: Г г) is a letter of the Cyrillic script. It represents the voiced velar plosive , like  in "gift", or the voiced glottal fricative , like  in "heft". It is generally romanized using the Latin letter g or h, depending on the source language.

History
The Cyrillic letter ge was derived directly from the Greek letter Gamma (Γ) in uncial script.

In the Cyrillic numeral system, it had a numerical value of 3.

Usage in Slavic languages

Belarusian, Rusyn, and Ukrainian
From these three languages, the letter is romanized with h. Its name is he in Belarusian and Ukrainian, and hy in Rusyn. 

In Belarusian (like in Southern Russian), the letter corresponds to the velar fricative  and its soft counterpart . 

In Ukrainian and Rusyn, it represents a voiced glottal fricative , a breathy voiced counterpart of the English .

In Ukrainian and Rusyn, a voiced velar plosive  is written with the Cyrillic letter ghe with upturn (Ґ ґ).

In all three languages' historical ancestor Ruthenian, the sound  was also represented by the digraph кг.

Russian
In standard Russian, ghe represents the voiced velar plosive  but is devoiced to  word-finally or before a voiceless consonant. It represents  before a palatalizing vowel. In the Southern Russian dialect, the sound becomes the velar fricative . Sometimes, the sound is the glottal fricative  in the regions bordering Belarus and Ukraine.

The sound is normally considered nonstandard or dialectal in Russian and is avoided by educated Russian speakers. (Bog, "God") is always pronounced  in the nominative case.

In the Russian nominal genitive ending , ghe represents , including in the word  ("today", from ).

The Latin letter h of words of Latin, Greek, English or German origin is usually transliterated into Russian with ghe rather than kha: hero → , hamburger → , Haydn → . That can occasionally cause ambiguity, as for example English Harry and Gary/Garry would be spelled the same in Russian, eg. Гарри Поттер). The reasons for using ghe to write h include the fact that ghe is used for h in Ukrainian, Belarusian and some Russian dialects, along with the perception that kha sounds too harsh. Nevertheless, in newer loanwords (especially from English), kha is often used.

South Slavic 
In standard Serbian, Bosnian, Montenegrin, Bulgarian and Macedonian the letter ghe represents a voiced velar plosive  but is devoiced to  word-finally or before a voiceless consonant.

Usage in non-Slavic languages 

In Ossetian, an Indo-Iranian language spoken in the Caucasus, ⟨г⟩ represents the voiced velar stop . However, the digraph ⟨гъ⟩ represents the voiced uvular fricative .

Related letters and other similar characters
Γ γ: Greek letter Gamma
G g: Latin letter G
H h: Latin letter H, romanized as in Belarusian, Ukrainian, and Rusyn
Z z: Latin letter Z, alternative form of italicized Cyrillic Г (ge)
Ґ ґ: Cyrillic letter ghe with upturn, the letter g, named ge in Ukrainian
Ѓ ѓ: Cyrillic letter Gje
Ғ ғ: Cyrillic letter Ghayn
₴: Ukrainian hryvnia (Currency sign)

Computing codes

References

External links